Newtown Anner or Newtownanner House is a historic country house in Clonmel, County Tipperary, previously a residence of the Osborne baronets.

Description

Newtown Anner House is a country house built in 1829. The house was a home of the Osbourne family and the Duke of St Albans. The wings of this house are unusual, as they are taller than the central block. The grounds of the house include a well-preserved walled garden, a ruined temple, and a shell grotto.

References

Buildings and structures in County Tipperary